Awe is a Local Government Area in Nasarawa State, Nigeria. The LGA's headquarters is in Awe Town. Awe has a population of 116,080 (2005 estimates) and total land mass is 2800 

The postal code of the Local Government is 951103, 951104, 951105.

References

Populated places in Nasarawa State